George Henry Ashall (29 September 1911 – May 1998) was an English professional footballer who played in the Football League for Wolverhampton Wanderers and Coventry City.

Career
Ashall became a coal miner upon leaving school but showed an interest in football, playing for several colliery football teams and having also had a trial at Huddersfield Town. He joined Wolverhampton Wanderers from Midland League Frickley Colliery to become a professional player in August 1935, and made his league debut on 4 March 1936, scoring in 1–0 win over Grimsby Town.

He was a first choice player over his two full seasons at Molineux, making 94 appearances in total and scoring 19 goals. His form won him a place in a Football League XI that faced the Scottish League in September 1937.

He moved to Coventry City in 1938, remaining on their books for almost a decade, but with the suspension of league football due to war limiting his appearances. He also guested for Northampton Town during this period before returning to his parent club when football resumed. In September 1947, he suffered a career-ending injury against West Bromwich Albion.

He died in May 1998.

References

 

1911 births
1998 deaths
People from Killamarsh
Footballers from Derbyshire
English footballers
Wolverhampton Wanderers F.C. players
Coventry City F.C. players
Upton Colliery F.C. players
Frickley Athletic F.C. players
English Football League players
Association football wingers
English Football League representative players
Northampton Town F.C. wartime guest players